The Believers is a graphic novel written by Abdul Sultan P P with illustrations by Partha Sengupta, and published by Phantomville.  It tells the story of two brothers living in two extremes from the Malappuram region of Kerala, one of whom returns to find his brother has engaged in extremist activities.

Abdul Sultan P P is with Varthamanam Daily, Calicut, Kerala as Assistant News Editor. The Believers reminds the extremist forces that 'eye for an eye leaves two blind'. It is regarded as the third Indian graphic novel after Sarnath Banerjee's Corridor and Orijit Sen's River of Stories.

Reviews
The book met with positive opinion, praising artwork and writing:
 Images from The Believers
 Article by The Hindu
 Article by Sawf News
 to find the book
 review in telegraph
 pdf image of the cover
 to find the book
 review in city express
 of Sarnath Banerjee
 review on the believers
 review of the book
 review in chinas business standard
 review in bahrain tribune
 title of phantomville

See also
Indian comics

Indian graphic novels